The  is a botanical garden operated by the Tokyo University of Agriculture, and located at 1737 Funako, Atsugi, Kanagawa, Japan.

The garden was established in 1967, and now cultivates about 1,500 species of useful plants, including  collections of Cactaceae and other succulents (such as Agave, Euphorbia, Kalanchoe, Stapelia, Sansevieria), Iris, Lilium, Paeonia, Rosa, Syringa, as well as flora of Asia and the Far East, Kazakhstan, Europe, the Americas, and medicinal plants and conifers such as Podocarpus. In addition, 310 species of wild plants grow in the garden.

See also 
 List of botanical gardens in Japan

References 
 BGCI entry
 Tokyo University Faculty of Agriculture

Gardens in Kanagawa Prefecture
Botanical gardens in Japan